Italian seasoning is a blend of ground herbs that commonly includes some combination of basil, oregano, rosemary, thyme, garlic powder, sage, or coriander. The blend varies by brand, with many having vague, nonspecific ingredient lists.

Despite the name it is an American creation, as pre-blended, dry herbs are not very common in Italy itself. However salamoia Bolognese consists of rosemary, sage, garlic, salt, and black pepper.

References 

Herb and spice mixtures
American condiments